KCLW (900 AM) is a radio station broadcasting a Classic Country music format. Licensed to Hamilton, Texas, United States.

History
Clyde L. Weatherby founded the radio station in 1948.

The station was assigned the call letters KOES on June 1, 1989.  On August 9, 1993, the station changed its call sign to the current KCLW.

References

External links
 
 

Classic country radio stations in the United States
CLW